Tullio Dall'Anese (1909 in Treviso – 2001 in Rome) was an Italian architect, painter, and sculptor, best remembered for his modernist architecture, such as his work on the Biblioteca Nazionale Centrale di Roma in 1975.

References 

1909 births
2001 deaths
20th-century Italian architects
Italian painters